Ross Kelly is an actor and writer who has had lead roles and co-starring in various films. A good portion of them are horror films which include The Stink of Flesh in 2005, Pretty Dead Things and Wedding Slashers in 2006, Army of the Dead in 2008 and Romeo & Juliet vs. The Living Dead in 2009. He has also had roles in The War Boys, Love N' Dancing, Trade and Save Me.

Career
Kelly's career in film began around 2005.

In the Richard Griffin directed vampire comedy Pretty Dead Things, he played the part of Rex Van Horn, a vampire hunter who for the most part, looks out for himself. The film was released in 2006. The same year Wedding Slashers was released. The film was directed by Carlos Scott. Kelly played the male lead in the film, playing the part of Alex who gets engaged to Jenna (played by Jessica Kinney). When they get engaged, people mysteriously start to die. The film also starred Richard Lynch. The following year he appeared in Save Me, and co-starred in The Donor Conspiracy. The film was about a couple of larrakin medical students who after getting expelled for playing a prank on their dean, unwittingly get mixed up underworld organ harvesting ring.

He had the lead role in the Joseph Conti directed horror Army of the Dead which was released in 2008. The film also featured Stefani Marchesi, Miguel Martinez, Vic Browder and Mike Hatfield.  Both Kelly and Hatfield had previously appeared as law enforcement officers in Trade.  He played the part of John who was married to Amy. He and his wife were among friends who in the Baja Desert to have some fun racing. Things don't go to plan as the professor who is with them has an agenda of his own which leads to the stirring up of an ancient curse and them being chased by an army of skeletons.
 
In the 2011 Klown Kamp Massacre, Kelly played Philbert, the typical goofy clown. His character was probably the most prominent among them. In 2013, he played a Vegas cop in The Last Stand which was directed by Kim Jee-woon.

He produced a made-for-television film Untitled Pajama Men Project which was released in 2016.

Filmography

References

External links
 IMdb: Ross Kelly

Living people
American male film actors
American male television actors
Year of birth missing (living people)